Roseisle distillery is a Speyside single malt Scotch whisky distillery , in Roseisle, near Elgin, Morayshire, in the Strathspey region of Scotland.

The distillery is owned by multinational drinks company Diageo.

The distillery opened in 2010 and is the largest-ever built at 3,000 sq m and a cost of £40million.

See also
 List of whisky brands
 List of whisky distilleries in Scotland

References

External links
 Scotchwhisky.com: Roseisle distillery
 Summers Inman: Diageo Roseisle Distillery in Moray has been named Scottish Building Project of the Year 2010 by RICS Scotland

Distilleries in Scotland
Scottish malt whisky
2010 establishments in Scotland
Economy of Moray

Diageo